The Army Show is an American sitcom television series that aired on The WB, first shown on September 13 and ended its run on December 13, 1998. The plot follows an army sergeant, played by David Anthony Higgins, who must take charge of a group of soldiers at Fort Bendix, Florida, while hiding his profitable schemes from his higher class officers.

Cast
 David Anthony Higgins as Sgt. David Hopkins
 John Sencio as John Caesar
 Harold Sylvester as Colonel John Henchy
 Victor Togunde as Ozzie Lee
 Craig Anton as Lt. Branford Handy
 Toby Huss as Rusty Link
 Ronnie Kerr as Romeo
 Ivana Miličević as Pvt. Lana Povac

Content
The show is about a former hacker named John Caesar (John Sencio) who joins the United States Army instead of going to prison, and is enlisted at a fictional military complex known as Fort Bendix. The camp is under the supervision of master sergeant David Hopkins (David Anthony Higgins). After an official from The Pentagon visits the camp and finds the recruits misbehaving, the show then deals with the recruits' attempts to keep the camp open.

Episodes

Critical reception
Anthony Shoemaker of the Dayton Daily News wrote that "This extremely stupid sitcom surrounding a band of misfits at a forgotten Army compound is one of the worst television programs I have seen."

References

External links
 

Television shows set in Florida
The WB original programming
1998 American television series debuts
1998 American television series endings
1990s American sitcoms
English-language television shows
Television series by Warner Bros. Television Studios
Television series by Castle Rock Entertainment
American military television series